Live in Europe is an album by the Fred Hersch Trio, released in May 2018.

Track listing 
 We See - 5:51
 Snape Maltings - 7:12
 Scuttlers - 2:50
 Skipping - 4:48
 Bristol Fog (For John Taylor) - 8:25
 Newklypso (For Sonny Rollins) - 8:40
 The Big Easy (For Tom Piazza) - 6:56
 Miyako - 7:10
 Black Nile - 6:43
 Solo Encore-Bluemonk

Personnel 
Musicians
 Fred Hersch – piano
 John Hébert – bass
 Eric McPherson – drums

References 

2018 live albums
Fred Hersch live albums